Bogard Township is a township in Henry County, in the U.S. state of Missouri.

Bogard Township was established in 1857, taking its name from a creek of the same name.

References

Townships in Missouri
Townships in Henry County, Missouri
1857 establishments in Missouri